You Me & Us is the debut album by English pop singer and actress Martine McCutcheon. Released in 1999, the album peaked at No. 2 in the UK Albums Chart.

The lead single taken from the album was "Perfect Moment", which reached No. 1 in the singles charts of four countries (United Kingdom, Ireland, Switzerland, and Italy) and received a platinum certification in the UK.

A second single, "I've Got You", was released from the album in September 1999. It charted at No. 6 in the UK.

The third and final single was the double A-side "Talking in Your Sleep"/"Love Me". The songs were remakes of "Talking in Your Sleep" by Crystal Gayle and "Love Me" by Yvonne Elliman. "Love Me" was also chosen as the 1999 BBC Children in Need single, with all proceeds from the release going to the charity. The single also reached No. 6 in the UK Singles Chart, reaching silver certification.

"Maybe This Time" is also a remake, the song having been introduced by Liza Minnelli in the film Cabaret.

Since its release, the album has sold in excess of 800,000 worldwide sales (and 300,000 UK sales) and has been certified Platinum. It is McCutcheon's biggest-selling and highest-charting album to date.

Unlike the album title and sleeve lettering, its title track is correctly punctuated with a comma.

Track listing

Charts

Weekly charts

Year-end charts

References

1999 debut albums
Martine McCutcheon albums
Innocent Records albums